Ogemdi Sharron Nwagbuo (born December 24, 1985) is an American football defensive tackle of the National Football League (NFL) who is currently a free agent.

Nwagbuo was signed by the New York Giants as an undrafted free agent in 2008. He played college football at Michigan State. He has also played for the San Diego Chargers.

Personal
His last name, Nwagbuo, is pronounced new-ah-bo. His parents moved to the U.S. from Nigeria before he was born. He is the half-brother of former San Francisco 49ers running back Xavier Omon.

Early years
Nwagbuo played high school football at Mount Miguel High School in Spring Valley, California, where he played only one season of varsity football. He only appeared in three plays all season, all against West Hills High school.

College career
As a senior, he started 12 games at nose tackle after serving as part-time starter on the defensive line in 2006. He started 18 career games and had 31 tackles, 4.5 tackles for losses and one sack in 2007 As a junior, he appeared in all 12 games in 2006, including starts in the first six games at defensive tackle and totaled 23 tackles (10 solos, 13 assists).

He was a Second-team All-Foothill Conference honors in 2005, at Southwestern College in Chula Vista, California and  recorded 55 tackles as a sophomore, including 10 sacks. He sat out the entire 2004 season. As a true freshman in 2004 he started nine games (seven games at defensive end and two at defensive tackle) and registered 45 tackles in 2003, including five sacks and he  scored his first collegiate touchdown vs. San Bernardino, recovering a fumble in the end zone.

Professional career
Nwagbuo was signed by the New York Giants as an undrafted free agent in 2008.

Nwagbuo worked at Enterprise Rent-a-Car, but was later signed as a practice player by the San Diego Chargers. He later gained a spot on the team's active roster.

On December 9, 2009, Nwagbuo was placed on Injured Reserve due to an ankle injury.

Nwagbuo was released by the Chargers during roster cuts on September 3, 2011, but he was re-signed on September 12. He was waived again on November 1.

On December 6, 2011, Nwagbuo was signed by the Carolina Panthers.

He was signed by the Detroit Lions on December 19, 2012, when Nick Fairley was placed on IR.

On December 30, 2013, Nwagbuo was signed by the Cincinnati Bengals.

On May 30, 2014, Nwagbuo was waived by the Bengals.

References

External links
 Michigan State Spartans bio
 San Diego Chargers bio

1985 births
Living people
American sportspeople of Nigerian descent
Players of American football from San Diego
American football defensive tackles
Michigan State Spartans football players
New York Giants players
San Diego Chargers players
Carolina Panthers players
Detroit Lions players
People from Spring Valley, San Diego County, California
Southwestern Jaguars football players